BOI is the commonly used acronym for Bureau of Investigation, used by numerous government agencies, presently and previously.

BOI may also refer to:
 The Bureau of Investigation, precursor to the Federal Bureau of Investigation
 The historical national investigative agency of Taiwan, the Bureau of Investigation
 The Alaskan Bureau of Investigation (ABI), a division of the Alaskan State Troopers
 Or any other state bureau of investigation